Bob Kirby-Harris (born 12 June 1952) is a former Secretary General of the International Union of Pure and Applied Physics and Chief Executive of the Institute of Physics.

Early life
He went to Ashford Grammar School (now The Norton Knatchbull School). He gained a 1st Class BSc in Theoretical Physics in 1973 from the University of Kent. From Clare College, Cambridge, he gained an MA in Applied Maths and Theoretical Physics in 1974. From the University of Sussex he gained a PGCE (Secondary schools) in 1975. From Plymouth Polytechnic he gained a DMS in 1985. From Lancaster University he gained a PhD in Higher Education Policy in 2003.

Career

School teacher
He was a school teacher from 1975 to 1977 at Wakeford School (now called Havant Academy) in Havant, Hampshire.

Royal Navy
In 1977 he joined the Royal Navy becoming an instructor and a Lieutenant Commander in 1982. From 1977 to 1979 he was a lecturer in Maths and Electronics at the Royal Navy Weapons Engineering School at Fareham (HMS Collingwood). From 1980 to 1983 he was based at Chatham, and from 1983 to 1985 he was a Senior Maths Lecturer at the Royal Naval Engineering College (RNEC Manadon) at Plymouth.

Academic administration
He has previous held posts as university manager at Middlesex University and the University of Namibia.

Since 2008 he has been the Secretary General of the International Union of Pure and Applied Physics. He was Chief Executive of the Institute of Physics between 2005 and 2012.

Personal life
In 1979 he married Abigail Mee and they have two sons.

References

External links
 IOP

Living people
Institute of Physics
1952 births
Royal Navy officers
Alumni of the University of Kent
Alumni of Clare College, Cambridge
Alumni of the University of Sussex
Alumni of the University of Plymouth
Alumni of Lancaster University
Schoolteachers from Kent
People educated at The Norton Knatchbull School